William Mainwaring (6 Oct 1735 – 28 February 1821) was the MP for Middlesex from 1784 and chairman of the Middlesex and Westminster Quarter Sessions for a similar period.

He was the eldest son of Boulton Mainwaring of Isleworth, Middlesex and educated at Merchant Taylors' School (1744–52). He then entered Lincoln's Inn in 1754 to study law and was called to the bar in 1759.

He was elected to serve as MP for Middlesex from 1784 to 1800. In the 1802 General election, he stood as candidate for Middlesex again was opposed by the radical Francis Burdett. Mainwaring had previously resisted Burdett's calls for an inquiry into prison abuses, particularly at Coldbath Fields Prison. Mainwaring was defeated by Burdett but the election was declared void in 1804 and in the following contest William's son George Boulton Mainwaring was elected. The result was reversed in favour of Burdett in 1805 and the back in favour of Mainwaring Junior in 1806. Mainwaring did not contest the 1807 election and Burdett was not elected.

He died in 1821, leaving one son.

References

1735 births
1821 deaths
People from Isleworth
People educated at Merchant Taylors' School, Northwood
Members of Lincoln's Inn
Governors of the Hudson's Bay Company
Members of the Parliament of Great Britain for English constituencies
British MPs 1784–1790
British MPs 1790–1796
British MPs 1796–1800
Members of the Parliament of the United Kingdom for English constituencies
UK MPs 1801–1802
18th-century English people
19th-century English politicians